Chittagong Abahani Reserves and Youth are the reserve team and youth system of the Chittagong based Bangladesh Premier League club Chittagong Abahani Ltd. The youth system consist of an under-18 men's team that currently competes in the BFF U18 Football League, the top tier league of youth football system in Bangladesh organised by the Bangladesh Football Federation. The under-18 team previously used to play in BFF U-18 Football Tournament. The reserve team, named as Chittagong Abahani Junior,  competes in the CJKS-CDFA Second Division Football League, the third tier football league of Chittagong football.

U-18 team

Current squad
The under-18 squad for 2021–22 season.

Reserves
The reserve team, officially known as Chittagong Abahani Limited Junior, competes in the regional league system of Chittagong. It currently competes in CJKS-CDFA Second Division Football League, the third tier regional league of Chittagong. The team, sometimes referred as Abahani Limited Junior or simply as Abahani Junior, playing in the regional league since 2003–2004. The squad of the reserve team built with the local players of Chittagong. They relegated from CJKS First Division Football League in 2018.

References

Under-18 association football
Youth football in Bangladesh
Football clubs in Bangladesh